The flag and coat of arms of Moldavia, one of the two Danubian Principalities, together with Wallachia, which formed the basis for the Romanian state, were subject to numerous changes throughout their history.

History
The recognised emblem belonging to the land of Moldavia, and perpetuated over the centuries as the official sign of the country, is the ancient aurochs's head with a star between its horns. The aurochs's head is flanked to the right by a sun and to the left by a new moon. There is not known when and under what circumstances did this representation appear as a symbol of the country, but scholars consider that the emblem existed before the foundation of the independent Moldavian feudal state by Bogdan I, in 1359. The oldest remaining representations of the coat of arms of Moldavia are the seals and coins dating from the reign of Petru Mușat (1375 - 1391). Traian Bița however observes that the legend (the text running around the perimeter) on the coins suggests the aurochs's head was originally the arms of the ruling dynasty, becoming the state's arms only during the rule of Stephen the Great. Consequently, the original state arms of Moldavia was a split shield, with a barry of six or seven on dexter and two to seven fleur-de-lis on sinister. Over the centuries, the image of the aurochs's head had undergone a constant evolution, being occasionally replaced by the wisent's head, so that by the middle of the 19th century, the image of the wisent came to be used more often.

The Moldavian state coat of arms (aurochs's head) differs from the Moldavian dynastic coat of arms (both with the initial elements and with its elements of various origins, some of them added over time to the shield). The state coat of arms was used on the great princely seal, coins, flags, some public buildings, and various other objects (princely sealing rings, battle or parade swords, etc.), while the dynastic coat of arms was also used on coins, but especially in circumstances related more to the particular life of the Moldavian voivodes (on church or monastery inscriptions, tombstones, bells, manuscripts, or personal belongings of the prince and members of his family).

Traditionally, two insignia have persisted constantly on the Moldavian flags: the head of the aurochs, as the symbol of the Moldavian state, and Saint George, as the ecclesiastical heraldic symbol of Moldavia. A princely standard was first attested under the rule of Prince Stephen the Great (late 15th century), displaying an enthroned Saint George set against a cherry background. The depiction of the Battle of Baia (1476) in Johannes de Thurocz's Chronicle shows Moldavian troops carrying a pennant with the aurochs's head on pales of unspecified colour. According to a well-known historical source, the princely flag of Stephen the Great worn during a ceremony in 1485 was described as the "great flag of red silk, beautifully reproducing in gold the coat of arms of the Land of Moldavia" ("Banderium quoque magnum sericeum coloris rubri, in quo arma Terrae Moldaviae pulchre auro depicta erant"). In 1574, Moldavian delegates to the coronation of Henry III of Poland are attested to have carried a blue banner with the aurochs head. 

Moldavia's fall under Ottoman Empire control, a process which was accelerated during the 16th century, saw a decline in flag usage; as princes became appointees of the sultans, the usage of a sandjak as a mark of authority became widespread.

In the coat of arms (either seal or blazon), the aurochs was initially a crest over a helmet and party per pale escutcheon, charged with either fleur-de-lis dexter and bars sinister (interpreted as being alternating vert and or) or the Patriarchal cross dexter (closely resembling the Cross of Lorraine in usual renditions) and fleur-de-lis sinister. In time reduced to the simple depiction of an aurochs's head on escutcheon, it was featured alongside the arms of Wallachia and Transylvania on Michael the Brave's seal, as well as only alongside Wallachia's on various symbols favored by rulers such as Radu Mihnea and several Phanariotes (in the latter case, it was more often than not accompanied by the double-headed eagle of Byzantine tradition).

The prevalent gules (or red) and or (yellow) display was replaced, towards the beginning of the 19th century, by variations on a red-blue theme. As such, when the Treaty of Adrianople allowed Wallachia and Moldavia a measure of sovereignty, Sultan Mahmud II awarded Moldavia a red over blue pennant to be used by its military, and Wallachia a yellow over blue one; Moldavia's pennant was similar to the version given recognition by Austria-Hungary as the Landesfarben of Bukovina (the latter was blue over red).

During the Organic Statute rule of Mihail Sturdza, the pennant was replaced by a war flag/naval ensign and a civil ensign with a blue field and a red canton standing for Ottoman suzerainty. Grigore Alexandru Ghica was to include the color yellow, already present in the pan-Romanian horizontal tricolour favored by the 1848 revolutionaries, in the war flag's pattern. In 1858, the aurochs became the central theme of the most valuable stamp in Romanian postal history, the Cap de Bour.

The aurochs head (dexter) and Wallachia's eagle (sinister) were included as emblems on the tricolour adopted by Alexandru Ioan Cuza after the union of the Danubian Principalities in 1859; the arms of Moldavia are nowadays represented in the coat of arms of Romania, as well as in that of the short-lived Moldavian Democratic Republic and present-day Moldova (having previously featured in the coat of arms of Bessarabia within the Russian Empire).

Gallery

Coat of arms

Flag

See also
Coat of arms of Moldova
Coat of arms of Romania
Flag of Moldova
Flag of Romania

References

Sources

External links

Principality of Moldavia and Wallachia and Moldavia, 1859–61 at Flags of the World
Coat of arms of Moldavia and Romanian flag on the Romanian Presidency site 
Coat of arms of the Ghika family 

Moldavia
Moldavia
Moldavia
Moldavia
Moldavia
Moldavia
Moldavia
Moldavia
Flags displaying animals